Portuguese Nagasaki and Ecclesiastical Nagasaki refer to the period during which the city of Nagasaki was under foreign administration, between the years of 1580 and 1587. Formally granted to the Jesuits, a representative of the Portuguese Crown was considered the highest authority in the city when present, as per Portuguese rights of Padroado.

First contacts with the Portuguese

The first Portuguese (and incidentally, Western) landfall on Japanese soil appears to have been in 1543, after a group of Portuguese merchants travelling aboard a trade junk towards China were blown off course to the island of Tanegashima.

Thereafter, trade began between Portuguese Malacca, China and Japan, as the Portuguese took advantage of the Chinese trade embargo on Japan to act as middlemen between the two nations. In 1550, King John III of Portugal declared the Japanese trade a "crown monopoly", and henceforth, only ships authorized by Goa were allowed to make the journey. In 1557 the authorities of Canton (Guangzhou) leased Macau to the Portuguese to support this trade, in exchange for tribute in silver.

The state of civil war in Japan was highly beneficial to the Portuguese, as several competing lords sought to attract the Portuguese "black ship" and its trade to their domains. Initially the Portuguese called either at Firando (Hirado) belonging to Matsura Takanobu, or Bungo belonging to Ōtomo Sōrin, but in 1562 shifted to Yokoseura when its lord, Omura Sumitada, offered to be the first lord to convert to Christianity, adopting the name Dom Bartolomeu. In 1564 he faced a rebellion instigated by Buddhist priests and Yokoseura was razed to the ground.

In 1571 Dom Bartolomeu, or Omura Sumitada, granted some land in the small fishing village of Nagasaki to the Jesuits, that was divided into six neighbourhoods, to receive exiled Christians from other territories and the Portuguese traders. The Jesuits constructed a chapel and a college under the name of St. Paul, like those of Goa and Malacca. By 1579 Nagasaki had 400 homes, with a few Portuguese casados (married men).

Lease
Fearful that Nagasaki might fall to his rival Takanobu, Omura Sumitada, or Dom Bartolomeu, decided to grant the city directly to the Jesuits in 1580.

As appointed "Visitor of Missions in the Indies", Alessandro Valignano was responsible for concluding with Sumitada the terms of the lease, including all the legal details, being himself a jurist. The Jesuits would be responsible for electing a regedor to administer the city and pledge allegiance to Sumitada, who was still nominally considered the lord of the territory. By this bilateral agreement, Nagasaki was in a very similar situation as Macau, where the Portuguese had agreed to pay the authorities of Guangzhou a fee to in exchange for special privileges over the territory.

The city

Unlike many Asian cities built on a grid inspired by the Chinese model, Nagasaki was built around a centre where the most important buildings were located, namely the church, the charity (the Misericórdia) and the town hall, though it did not have any fortifications.

Between 1603 and 1613 Nagasaki would also have a painting school, guided by the Italian Giovanni Nicolo.

Nagasaki had a "Civil Code" and "Criminal Code", distinct from Japanese law - which was adapted to Roman law; corporal punishments were lessened. The city was described as having "an unusual number of children" as its Christian inhabitants avoided infanticide, otherwise common in Japanese society. The houses were painted white, as in Portuguese fashion. The city had 5000 inhabitants by 1590, and 15,000 in 1600.

The "black ship" or ships, known to the Portuguese as the nau do trato ("the trade ship"), arrived from Goa once every year, between August and September and left as soon as the winds shifted, usually in November or afterwards, in February or March – a journey that could take as many as 2 years or more to complete, because of the different monsoon patterns throughout east and southeast Asia. Whenever the ship was in port, its captain served as the highest authority in any matter pertaining the city.

End of the grant

In 1586, the lands of the Omura clan were overrun by forces of Shimazu Yoshihisa, greatly threatening the city. At the request of Otomo Sorin of Bungo, Toyotomi Hideyoshi intervened, and so Shimazu Yoshihisa was defeated the following year. Hideyoshi however, took the chance to announce the first anti-Christian edict, and ordered that Nagasaki be returned to Omura clan control, thus putting an end to foreign control of the city. Nevertheless, it remained the main port of call for the Portuguese ships in the decades that followed.

See also
Nanban trade
Arte da Lingoa de Iapam
Battle of Fukuda Bay
Fernão Mendes Pinto

References

Bibliography
João Paulo Oliveira e Costa (1993) Portugal and Japan - The Namban Century Lisbon, Imprensa Nacional Casa da Moeda.
Luís Fróis (1549-1593) História do Japão Lisbon, Biblioteca Nacional de Lisboa, 1976 edition.
Charles Ralph Boxer (1959): The Great Ship From Amacon: Annals of Macao and the Old Japan Trade, 1555-1640.
Charles Ralph Boxer (1951): The Christian Century in Japan 1549-1650 University of California Press.

16th century in Portuguese India
16th century in Japan
1580s in Japan
History of Nagasaki
Portuguese colonisation in Asia
Portuguese Empire
1580 in Japan
History of Christianity in Japan